Monodora stenopetala is a species of plant in the family Annonaceae.  It is native to Malawi and Mozambique.  Daniel Oliver, the English botanist who first formally described the species, named it after its narrow (Latinized form of Greek , stenos) petals.

Description
It is a bush or small tree.  Its leaves are 8.5-11 by 3-4.2 centimeters and rounded at their tips.  The leaves are lightly hairy on their upper and lower surfaces.  Its petioles are 3-4 millimeters long.  Its solitary flowers are extra-axillary.  Each flower is on a pedicel 1-1.6 centimeters long.  Its flowers have 3 oblong sepals that are 4-5 millimeters long.  The sepals are smooth, curved backwards, and have wavy or fringed margins. Its 6 petals are arranged in two rows of 3.  The outer petals are yellow, 3.5-5 by 0.2-0.4 centimeters, and smooth or lightly hairy.  The inner petals are similarly colored.  The inner petals have a 0.3-0.7 centimeter long claw at their base and a 0.2-0.4 by 0.35-0.5 centimeter blade.  The inner petals are smooth on their outer surface, and hairy inside. Its stamens that are 0.35 millimeters long.  Its fruit are 6 by 4 centimeters smooth ellipsoids.  Its smooth yellow-brown seeds are 1.5-2 centimeters long.

Reproductive biology
The pollen of M. stenopetala is shed as permanent tetrads.

Habitat and distribution
It has been observed growing in dense thickets and woodslands at elevations from 100-500 meters.

Uses
It has been reported to be used in Mozambique as a traditional medicine.

References

stenopetala
Flora of Malawi
Flora of Mozambique
Plants described in 1868
Taxa named by Daniel Oliver